Brozas is a municipality located in the province of Cáceres, Extremadura, Spain. According to the 2006 census (INE), the municipality has a population of 2248 inhabitants.
The climate is of Mediterranean type, with an average temperature of 16,4 °C and an average rainfall of 460 L/m ²

References

Municipalities in the Province of Cáceres